Platycypha fitzsimonsi, the boulder jewel or Fitzsimon's jewel is a species of damselfly in the family Chlorocyphidae. It is endemic to South Africa where its natural habitats include wooded and forested streams and  rivers.

This is a fairly small species; 29–34 mm long with a wingspan of 46–54 mm. The mature male has an orange-red and black striped thorax and a distinctive red, black and blue abdomen. Females and immature males are dark brown and khaki.

Gallery

References

External links

  Platycypha fitzsimonsi on African Dragonflies and Damselflies Online

Chlorocyphidae
Odonata of Africa
Insects of South Africa
Insects described in 1950